This is a list of museums in Montreal, in the province of Quebec, Canada. Also included are non-profit art galleries and university art galleries. Museums that exist only in cyberspace (i.e., virtual museums) are not included.

See also List of museums in Quebec for museums in the rest of the province.

List of museums

Defunct museums
 Stewart Museum, 1955-2021, collection to be merged with McCord Museum (former website)
 Just for Laughs Museum, closed in 2010
 Musée Marc-Aurèle Fortin, closed in 2007, collection now at the Montreal Museum of Fine Arts
 Musee historique canadien, 1935-1989, wax museum about Canadian history,
 Musée Grévin Montreal, wax museum, closed in 2021
 Sisters of Saint Anne Historic Centre, closed in 2014
 Montreal Fashion Museum, closed in 2018, collection now at the McCord Museum
 Telecommunication Museum in Lachine, closed in 2019
 Printmaking Museum, Lovell Building, closed its original historic site, relocated in 2016 to Collège Ahunsic
 Museum of the Miséricordia Sisters, closed in 2020

Montreal Museums Day
Montreal Museums Day is an annual event in Montreal. One Sunday every May, more than 30 of the city's largest museums and galleries offer free admission and extended opening hours. To facilitate visitor access to as many museums as possible, the Montreal Transit Corporation provides free shuttle buses.

The first Montreal Museums Day was held in 1987.

References

External links
Official website

 
Montreal
Museums
Montreal
Montreal
Museums in Montreal